Rex Mundi is Latin for King of the World.

Rex Mundi may also refer to:

 Rex Mundi (comics), an American comic book series
 Rex Mundi (Malibu Comics), a fictional character in Malibu Comics' Ultraverse imprint
 Rex Mundi High School, a former Catholic high school in Evansville, Indiana, USA
 Rex Mundi, a DJ signed to Armada Music
 The evil God in Cathar cosmology

See also
 King of the World (disambiguation)